Mohammad Ahmadi is an Iranian film director, cinematographer and producer.

Awards
Gold plate and honorary diploma for best dialogue from the fourth Kish Festival, 2002
Honorary diploma for best dialogue from the ninth Holy defense festival, Mashhad, 2002
Winner of Best Short Documentary from The 5th Human Rights Documentary Film Festival of Prague, ONE WORLD, Czech Republic 2003
Best documentary film from Melbourne Film Festival, Australia 2003
Golden Didor, 2nd Didor International Film Festival 2006
Ecumenical Prize, Molodost, International Film Festival Kyiv 2006 for the film Poet of the Wastes (Shaer-e Zobale-ha) . The ecumenical jury awarded this film because it tells the story of a street sweeper who dreams of becoming a poet. Although he lives in very poor and desperate conditions, he manages to keep his human dignity and love of people and life itself under any circumstances. The difficulties of his everyday life do not influence his inner world and he manages to love people, to enjoy every moment of his life and to keep his dream alive. The Jury found the message of this film very important for people who are trying to survive in the difficult conditions of today's society. The message is that each of us should go through this life keeping their human dignity and dream in their heart, loving people and life.

Filmography
 Captive , Waiting ....  ( 2002  Documentary )
 Poet Of The Wastes      ( 2005 )
 Nature's Hymor          ( 2006  Documentary  )
 Lost Truth              ( 2007  )

External links
Official website

Living people
People from Yazd
Iranian photographers
Iranian film producers
Iranian film directors
Iranian cinematographers
Iranian male film actors
University of Tehran alumni
Ahmadi, Mohammed